Verkhnyaya Storona is a rural locality (a village) in Pelshemskoye Rural Settlement, Sokolsky District, Vologda Oblast, Russia. The population was 14 as of 2002.

Geography 
Verkhnyaya Storona is located 50 km southeast of Sokol (the district's administrative centre) by road. Nizhnyaya Storona is the nearest rural locality.

References 

Rural localities in Sokolsky District, Vologda Oblast